Deng Jiajia (born 17 May 1983) is a Chinese actress.

Deng is noted for playing Tang Youyou in the sitcom television series IPartment, which enjoyed the highest ratings in China when it was broadcast.

Early life
Deng was born in a military family in Neijiang, Sichuan on May 17, 1983. Her father is good at singing and dancing, thus inspiring Deng from an early age to be a star. At the age of four, Deng sang and danced on the Spring Festival evening party of Neijiang city. Deng started learning using electronic organ by age six. Deng became the student in charge of entertainment in her class during her school-days.

Deng began her career by attending the reality show Holiday Story when she was a senior high school student, she won the championship.

Deng graduated from Communication University of China, majoring in acting.

Acting career
Deng began her career by appearing in small roles in several wuxia television series, such as Ode to Gallantry, Chinese Paladin and The Legend of Chu Liuxiang.

In 2011, Deng rose to fame for her role in IPartment 2, which was one of the most watched ones in mainland China in that year. Deng also filmed in a number of successful sequels to IPartment.

In 2013, Deng starred in Silent Witness, a crime thriller film; and received critical acclaim for her performance. She won the Best Supporting Actress awards at the Hundred Flowers Awards and Golden Rooster Awards.

In 2018, Deng starred in the critically acclaimed crime drama Burning Ice.

In 2019, Deng starred in the historical drama Empress of the Ming, portraying Hu Shanxiang. For her role as Hu Shanxiang, she was nominated as a Best Actress in a Supporting role for the 2020 Magnolia Awards.

Filmography

Film

Television series

Awards and nominations

References

External links

1983 births
People from Neijiang
Communication University of China alumni
Actresses from Sichuan
Living people
Chinese film actresses
Chinese television actresses
21st-century Chinese actresses